HammerFall is a Swedish power metal band.

Hammerfall or HammerFall or variant may also refer to:

 Hammerfall, a small village in the Norwegian municipality Sørfold
 Hammerfall (novel), a novel in C. J. Cherryh's fictional Gene Wars universe
 Hammerfall, a fictional city in the Warcraft series
 'Hammer Fall', a fictional event in the 1977 Niven-Pournelle apocalyptic science-fiction novel Lucifer's Hammer

See also
 Hammerfell, a fictional province in The Elder Scrolls video games
 Hammer (disambiguation)